Draff Young  (April 9, 1942 – March 24, 2012) was a National Basketball Association (NBA) coach.

Draff had a lifetime love and passion for basketball. His inspiration for basketball was stirred when his Uncle Perry put a peach barrel rim on the side of the house; this enabled him and his cousins to play basketball. Draff played basketball while attending Johnson C. Smith University, and after leaving college he began his career in professional basketball.

His career included an accomplishment of serving as Director of Public Relations and Promotions for Randolph Manufacturing Company, Randolph, Massachusetts (1965–1968). He appeared as a guest host on many television programs, in and outside the United States. He played with Marcus Haynes and the Fabulous Magicians during their Massachusetts appearances. He also played with Sam "Boom Boom" Wheeler and his All-Stars when they made their New England swing (1964–1968).

In 1967, Draff started a basketball program at the Boston School of the Deaf.

He served in the NBA from 1969–1974 as coach for the Cincinnati Royals and the Kansas City Omaha Kings.

In 1973, he became the first African-American who did not play in the NBA to serve as a head coach in the league  when he coached for four games for the Kansas City-Omaha Kings. He also served as assistant coach on the USA Olympic basketball team that toured the United States in 1973.

From 1974–1977, he served as assistant basketball coach at Oral Roberts University.

From 1977–1978, he served as an assistant basketball coach at the University of Southern California.

Draff was Head National Men's Basketball coach for the country of Kuwait in 1978. He served as the Olympic Basketball coach for the country of Qatar from 1987–1994. From 1994–2006, he was Head basketball coach at Al Jahra Sports Club.

He was a basketball TV Sports Analyst for the NBA from 2003–2006.

After many years of traveling across the United States and various other countries pursuing his love of basketball, Draff returned to Timmonsville, South Carolina in pursuit of a spiritual journey. He began attending Zion Temple Holiness Church and was a dedicated member who could be seen many days praying in his parked car in the church's parking lot. He was appointed Deacon at Zion Temple and served faithfully until his health failed and he could no longer attend services.

Draff possessed a jovial personality and he found a special interest in everyone around him. His deep, husky laughter is greatly missed by the friends and family touched by his presence.

References

External links
 BasketballReference.com: Draff Young

1942 births
2012 deaths
American men's basketball coaches
Johnson C. Smith Golden Bulls basketball players
Kansas City-Omaha Kings head coaches
American sports announcers
American men's basketball players